Kuliyamakhi (Dargwa: Кулиямахьи) is a rural locality (a selo) in Natsinsky Selsoviet, Akushinsky District, Republic of Dagestan, Russia. The population was 210 as of 2010. There are 4 streets.

Geography 
Kuliyamakhi is located 38 km south of Akusha (the district's administrative centre) by road, on the Kalakherk River. Karayamakhi is the nearest rural locality.

References 

Rural localities in Akushinsky District